Agnieszka Ceglarek (born 3 May 1988 in Poznań, Poland) is a Polish track and field athlete and sprinter.

As a competitor for Olimpia Poznań, Ceglarek won the gold medal in the 2005 European Athletics Junior Championships in Kaunas in 2005, where the Polish 4 x 100 m relay team consisting of Agnieszka Ceglarek, Marika Popowicz, Marta Jeschke, and Iwona Brzezińska took first place. She also won the bronze medal in the 2007 European Athletics Junior Championships in Hengelo in 2007, where the Polish 4 x 100 m relay team of Martyna Książek, Marika Popowicz, Agnieszka Ceglarek, and Weronika Wedler took third place. Ceglarek is also the runner up for the 4 x 100 m relay in the 2009 European Athletics U23 Championships in Kaunas in 2009, where the Polish team of Agnieszka Ceglarek, Marika Popowicz, Ewelina Ptak, and Weronika Wedler took second place with a time of 43.90 s.

Personal bests 
 100 metres - 11.69 (2007)
 200 metres - 23.99 (2007)
 60 metres (indoors) - 7.60 (2005)

References 

1988 births
Living people
Polish female sprinters
Sportspeople from Poznań